Sulfoquinovose, also known as 6-sulfoquinovose and 6-deoxy-6-sulfo-D-glucopyranose, is a monosaccharide sugar that is found as a building block in the sulfolipid sulfoquinovosyl diacylglycerol (SQDG). Sulfoquinovose is a sulfonic acid derivative of glucose, the sulfonic acid group is introduced into the sugar by the enzyme UDP-sulfoquinovose synthase (SQD1). Sulfoquinovose is degraded through a metabolic process termed sulfoglycolysis. The half-life for mutarotation of sulfoquinovose at pD 7.5 and 26C is 299 minutes.

See also 
 Sulfolipid
 Sulfoglycolysis

References

Sulfonic acids
Deoxy sugars
Monosaccharides
Sulfate esters